The Raritan Formation is a Cretaceous (Turonian) sedimentary geologic formation of the Atlantic Coastal Plain.

The formation is described in the USGS publication Tolchester folio, Maryland (1917) as follows:
The formation consists of diverse materials similar to those composing the Patapsco formation, except that, in general, the clays are not so highly colored. White and buff sands; stratified light chocolate-colored sandy clays, in places containing leaf impressions; light-colored argillaceous sands and sandy clays (Fuller's earth); and white, yellow, drab, bluish-drab, and variegated clays all occur in deposits of this age. The variegated clays are well exposed in the steep bluff at Worton Point (see photo below). The delicate pinkish tints which they present at many places have given rise to the local name "peach-blossom clays."

Fossils
Dinosaur remains are among the fossils that have been recovered from the formation, although none have yet been referred to a specific genus. A tyrannosauroid similar to Appalachiosaurus is known from the formation.

Many plant fossils have been recovered from the Raritan.

See also

 List of dinosaur-bearing rock formations
 List of stratigraphic units with indeterminate dinosaur fossils

References 

  

Geologic formations of New Jersey
Cretaceous geology of New Jersey
Upper Cretaceous Series of North America
Turonian Stage
Paleontology in New Jersey